United States of Love is a 2016 Polish drama film directed by Tomasz Wasilewski. It was selected to compete for the Golden Bear at the 66th Berlin International Film Festival. At Berlin, Wasilewski won the Silver Bear for Best Script.

Cast
 Julia Kijowska as Agata
 Magdalena Cielecka as Iza
 Dorota Kolak as Renata
 Marta Nieradkiewicz as Marzena
 Andrzej Chyra as Karol

Reception

Critical response
In a positive review for the Krakow Post Giuseppe Sedia commended the film for "the overwhelming use of grey in the superb cinematography by Romanian new wave hero Oleg Mutu" adding that "grey is also used to drench the stories of the four leading female roles in the monotony and dreariness of their daily life without Antonioni-esque cliches".

References

External links
 

2016 films
2016 drama films
Polish drama films
2010s Polish-language films